John Holden may refer to:

John Holden (Australian politician) (1810–1860)
John Rose Holden (1821–1879), Canadian politician and lawyer
John Holden (bishop) (1882–1949), missionary of the Anglican Church
John Holden (artist) (born 1943), English artist
John Holden (British Army officer) (1913–1995)
John Burt Holden (1873–1928), Justice of the Supreme Court of Mississippi
Andy Holden (athlete) (John Andrew Holden, 1948–2014), English long-distance runner

See also
Jon Robert Holden (born 1976), basketball player
Jack Holden (disambiguation)
Holden (surname)